Ştefan Gorda (born 11 January 1960) is a Moldovan diplomat. He was the Moldovan Ambassador to the Czech Republic.

References

Living people
1960 births
Ambassadors of Moldova to the Czech Republic